Lent is a neighbourhood of Nijmegen and former village in the Dutch province of Gelderland. It is located in the municipality of 
Nijmegen, about 2 km north of that city, on the north bank of the Waal river.

History 
The village was first mentioned in 1196 as in Lente. The etymology is unclear.

The Dutch Reformed church dates from 1329. The tower was added in 1886. Lent was home to 1,171 people in 1840.

Lent was a separate municipality until 1818, when it was merged with Elst. In 1998, it was merged into Nijmegen. The population at the time of merger was about 3,000 people, however it almost quadrupled in 20 years due to neighbourhoods being built in Lent.

Gallery

References

External links
Official site Nijmegen

Populated places in Gelderland
Former municipalities of Gelderland
Nijmegen